The Harrogate by-election was held on 11 March 1954.  It was caused by the resignation of the incumbent Conservative MP, Christopher York.  It was won by the Conservative candidate James Ramsden.

References

By-elections to the Parliament of the United Kingdom in North Yorkshire constituencies
1954 in England
1954 elections in the United Kingdom
Harrogate
1950s in Yorkshire